This is a list of newspapers in the Republic of Cyprus.

Daily newspapers

Greek language
Alithia 
Haravgi 
Makhi
Phileleftheros 
Politis 
Simerini

English language
Cyprus Mail

Discontinued
The Cyprus Times

Weekly

Greek language
Kathimerini

English language
Cyprus Observer
Cyprus Today
Cyprus Weekly 
Financial Mirror

See also
List of newspapers
List of newspapers in Northern Cyprus
Media of Cyprus

References

Newspapers
Cyprus